Tebay is a village and civil parish in Cumbria, England, within the historic borders of Westmorland. It lies in the upper Lune Valley, at the head of the Lune Gorge. The parish had a population of 728 in the 2001 census, increasing to 776 at the Census 2011.

Historically a sheep farming area, the arrival of the railway led to increased prosperity.

History

To the north, occupying a strategic position by the River Lune, now close to the M6 motorway, are the earthwork remains of a motte and bailey castle known as Castle Howe.

During the Roman occupation a Roman road followed the course of the River Lune linking the Roman fort at Low Borrowbridge near Tebay with one at Over Burrow south of Kirkby Lonsdale. Another road, recently discovered using LIDAR, linked the fort at Low Borrowbridge with the fort to the north at Kirkby Thore, and thence to Whitley Castle and then Carvoran on Hadrian's Wall.

Tebay was the home of the prophetess Mary Baynes, known as the 'Witch of Tebay', who died in 1811.

Tebay was historically a township in the ancient parish of Orton.  It became a separate civil parish in 1897.

Transport

Railways

Tebay railway station was on the Lancaster and Carlisle Railway, which was built to link those two cities between 1844 and 1846, and which was absorbed by the London and North Western Railway in 1879. Tebay became an important junction for, in 1861, the Stainmore Railway, from Tebay-Kirkby Stephen-Barnard Castle and later becoming part of the North Eastern Railway, brought traffic from the east; it was closed in 1962. The A685 runs over much of its trackbed east from Tebay towards Kirkby Stephen. The Ingleton Branch Line of the Lancaster and Carlisle Railway connecting via the Midland Railway to Settle and Leeds, enters the main line at the south end of the Lune Gorge; it was built in the 1850s, and was last used for passengers in the winter 1962-63 as a relief to the main line.

The railway companies provided much employment for local people and this brought about the construction of housing to accommodate the increased population.

The village has had two railway accidents happen nearby. On 15 February 2004, four people were run over by a maintenance vehicle in the Tebay rail accident. Three years later, the Grayrigg rail crash happened on 23 February 2007 between Oxenholme and Tebay on the West Coast Main Line.

Roads
Junction 38 of the M6 lies just west of the village, south of the notoriously exposed Shap Summit. Like its predecessor, the main railway line, it uses the upper reaches of the River Lune to pass through the fells. Tebay Services, a mile north west of the village in the neighbouring parish of Orton, is one of the very few motorway service stations to be run independently, and has often won praise for its food.

Village

Central to the village is the Railway Club, which provides a concrete link to the past importance of the village. The Cross Keys pub in the village also provide a place where the inhabitants can come together.

In times past, much of the populace was involved with the railway. The local Junction Hotel is now flats but once had dance halls.

See also

Listed buildings in Tebay

References

External links

 Cumbria County History Trust: Tebay (nb: provisional research only - see Talk page)

 
Villages in Cumbria
Railway towns in England
Westmorland
Civil parishes in Cumbria
Roman sites in Cumbria
Eden District